Burgric (or Burhric) was a medieval Bishop of Rochester. He was consecrated between January 933 and May 934. He died between 946 and 964.

Citations

References

External links
 

Bishops of Rochester
10th-century English bishops
10th-century deaths
Year of birth unknown